Robert Veljanovski (born  in Skopje, SFR Yugoslavia) is a Macedonian actor and former Director of the Drama Theatre in Skopje, Macedonia.

Biography 
He graduated at the Faculty of Dramatic Arts at Ss. Cyril and Methodius University of Skopje and has been working at the Drama Theatre since 1997. Veljanovski has played various roles in theatre, films, television and radio projects. He has also performed in advertisements.

Roles

Theatre 
The following is a list of selected roles played by Veljanovski:

Filmography

References

External links 
 

20th-century Macedonian male actors
Ss. Cyril and Methodius University of Skopje alumni
Male actors from Skopje
1968 births
Living people
21st-century Macedonian male actors
Macedonian male film actors
Macedonian male stage actors